Bleak House is a 1920 British silent drama film directed by Maurice Elvey and starring Constance Collier, Berta Gellardi, and Helen Haye. It is an adaptation of Charles Dickens' 1853 novel Bleak House. It was one of many silent film versions of Dickens' stories.

Cast
Constance Collier - Lady Dedlock
Berta Gellardi - Esther Summerson
Helen Haye - Miss Barbay
E. Vivian Reynolds - Tulkinghorne
Norman Page - Guppy
Clifford Heatherley - Bucket
Ion Swinley - Captain Hawdon
A. Harding Steerman - Sir Leicester Dedlock
Anthony St. John - Jo
Teddy Arundell - George
Beatrix Templeton - Rachel

References

External links

1920 films
British historical drama films
British silent feature films
1920s English-language films
Films directed by Maurice Elvey
1920s historical drama films
Films based on British novels
Films set in England
Ideal Film Company films
Films based on works by Charles Dickens
Films set in London
British black-and-white films
1920 drama films
Works based on Bleak House
1920s British films
Silent drama films